Stop Train 349, is a 1963 internationally co-produced drama film directed by Rolf Hädrich. It was released in the US in 1964 by Allied Artists. It was entered into the 13th Berlin International Film Festival.  Screenwriter Will Tremper won the Film Award in Gold of the 1964 German Film Awards. The film's sets were designed by the art director Dieter Bartels.

Plot
An East Berlin refugee trying to escape to West Berlin sneaks aboard a train run by the US military and causes an international incident.

Cast
 José Ferrer as Cowan the Reporter
 Sean Flynn as Lt. Novak
 Nicole Courcel as Nurse Kathy
 Jess Hahn as Sgt. Torre
 Yossi Yadin as Maj. Menschikov (as Yoseph Yadin)
 Hans-Joachim Schmiedel as Banner
 Christiane Schmidtmer as Karin (as Christiane Schmidmer)
 Joy Aston as Mrs. Abramson
 Lothar Mann as East German Conductor
 Arthur Brauss as I.M.P. (as Art Brauss)
 Edward Meeks as Capt. Kolski
 Fred Dur as Maj. Finnegan
 Len Monroe as U.S. Soldier
 Wolfgang Georgi as Russian Officer Gorski
 Antonella Murgia as Teenager

Production
The film was originally known as Marienborn. It was based on a true incident about an American train going to Berlin that was stopped in the Eastern sector and had a refugee removed.

References

External links
  (credits of the US version of the film, not the original version)
 filmportal.de entry (German)

1963 films
1963 drama films
German drama films
French drama films
Italian drama films
West German films
English-language German films
1960s German-language films
Cold War films
French black-and-white films
German black-and-white films
Italian black-and-white films
Films directed by Rolf Hädrich
Films set in West Germany
Films set in East Germany
German television films
Rail transport films
Allied Artists films
1960s English-language films
1960s German films
1960s Italian films
1960s French films
Das Erste original programming